The Army Special Operations Brigade (Army Spec Ops Bde) (previously called the Specialised Infantry Group) is a formation of the British Army, initially created as a result of the Army 2020 Refine reorganisation, intended to train foreign forces. Its name and role was adapted after the Defence in a Competitive Age reforms, to a unit that not only trains partner nations, but also fights alongside them in "complex high-threat environments".

History

Specialised Infantry Group
The group was formed to work alongside partner forces, a role which has similarities to that of the US Army Security Force Assistance Brigades.  Initially formed in October 2017 with the 4th Battalion, The Rifles (4 Rifles) and Royal Scots Borderers, 1st Battalion, Royal Regiment of Scotland (1 Scots). in July 2018, the 2nd Battalion, Princess of Wales' Royal Regiment  was added to the Group. and in January 2019, a fourth battalion, the 2nd Battalion, Duke of Lancaster's Regiment, was added and this was followed by the 3rd Battalion, The Royal Gurkha Rifles in 2020.

In February 2018, 4 Rifles deployed for the first time to Kuwait to work with the Kuwait Army and Kuwait National Guard. R Company, It also trained the Afghan Army and forces in Iraq and Afghanistan. In July 2018, C Company from the 2 PWRR was dispatched to Nigeria, where 1 Scots also trained the Nigerian Army for their fight against Boko Haram.

Army Special Operations Brigade
In August 2021 the group was re-designated as the Army Special Operations Brigade, with the four battalions of the newly created Ranger Regiment and two reinforcement companies of the Royal Gurkha Rifles along with 255 Signal Squadron under command, and 1 Squadron Honourable Artillery Company attached to provide long-range surveillance patrols.

The mentoring and training role that was previously undertaken by the Specialised Infantry Group, will be taken on by a new brigade, formed through the conversion of 11th Infantry Brigade, into the 11th Security Force Assistance Brigade.

The inaugural Brigade Commander is Brigadier Angus Fair who formerly commanded the Specialised Infantry Group.

Structure

Former Structure (2021) 
The structure of the Specialised Infantry Group in March 2021 was as follows:

 Group Headquarters at Saint Omer Barracks, Aldershot Garrison
 Royal Scots Borderers, 1st Battalion, Royal Regiment of Scotland (1 SCOTS), at Palace Barracks, Belfast
 2nd Battalion, Princess of Wales's Royal Regiment (2 PWRR), at Keogh Barracks, Mytchett
 2nd Battalion, Duke of Lancaster's Regiment (2 LANCS), at Elizabeth Barracks, Pirbright Camp
 4th Battalion, The Rifles (4 RIFLES), at Normandy Barracks, Aldershot Garrison
 3rd Battalion, The Royal Gurkha Rifles (3 RGR), at Aldershot Garrison

Future Structure (2030) 

The future structure of the brigade (by 2030) will be:

 Brigade Headquarters at Saint Omer Barracks, Aldershot Garrison
255 Signal Squadron, Royal Corps of Signals, at Swinton Barracks, Perham Down (Aldershot from 2027)
1st Battalion, Ranger Regiment (1 RANGER), at Palace Barracks, Belfast
2nd Battalion, Ranger Regiment (2 RANGER), at Keogh Barracks, Mytchett
 F (Falklands) Company, The Royal Gurkha Rifles
3rd Battalion, Ranger Regiment (3 RANGER), at Elizabeth Barracks, Pirbright Camp
4th Battalion, Ranger Regiment (4 RANGER), at Normandy Barracks, Aldershot Garrison 
 G (Coriano) Company, The Royal Gurkha Rifles
Joint Counter Terrorist Training and Advisory Team, at Risborough Barracks, Shorncliffe Army Camp
 1 Squadron, Honourable Artillery Company will provide Special Patrols to the Brigade.

See also 
 Security Force Assistance Brigade – United States Army equivalent
11th Security Force Assistance Brigade – British Army formation taking on the role of the former Spec Inf Gp.

References

External links 
 Army Special Operations Brigade

Military units and formations of the British Army
Military units and formations established in 2017
Infantry units and formations of the British Army
Future Soldier